The 1947–48 season was Fussball Club Basel 1893's 54th season in their existence. It was their second season in the top flight of Swiss football after their promotion from the Nationalliga B during the season 1945–46. Basel played their home games in the Landhof, in the Quarter Kleinbasel. Jules Düblin was the club's chairman for the second successive season.

Overview 
Anton Schall was to continue as first team manager, but he died at the age of 40 years, during a workout on the football field, shortly after the pre-season training had begun. Following this unhappy event captain Ernst Hufschmid then took over as player-manager. Basel played a total of 46 games in this season. Of these 26 in the Nationalliga A, four in the Swiss Cup and 16 were test games. The test games resulted with eight victories, three draws and five defeats. In total, they won 18 games, drew 13 and lost 15 times. In total, including the test games and the cup competition, they scored 100 goals and conceded 93.

There were fourteen teams contesting in the 1947–48 Nationalliga A, the bottom two teams in the table to be relegated. Suffering under the shock of team manager Schall's death, the team started the season badly, losing six of their first eleven games without a single victory. With seven victories in the second half of the season the team were able to lift themselves out of the relegation zone. Basel finished the season in 10th position in the table, with seven victories from 26 games, ten draws and they lost nine times. The team scored 44 goals in the domestic league. Paul Stöcklin was the team's top goal scorer with 11 goals. Gottlieb Stäuble was second best scorer with eight goals. René Bader and Traugott Oberer both scored five times. Bellinzona won the championship. FC Bern and Cantonal Neuchatel ended the season on the relegation places.

In the Swiss Cup Basel started in round 3 with a home match against SC Balerna, the game was won 7–0. In round 4 Basel were drawn with a home tie against Zürich which was won 2–1. Round 5 gave Basel another home tie in the Landhof against Locarno and this ended with a 5–3 victory. Thus Basel advanced to the quarter-finals, where they were drawn away against La Chaux-de-Fonds. The hosts won the game by two goals to nil and continued to the semi-final and the final. The final was played on 29 March at Wankdorf Stadium in Bern against Grenchen and ended with a 2–2 draw. The replay three weeks later was also drawn 2–2 and so a second replay was required. This was played on 27 June in the Stade Olympique de la Pontaise in Lausanne. La Chaux-de-Fonds won the trophy, winning the game by four goals to nil.

Players 
The following is the list of the Basel first team squad during the season 1947–48. The list includes players that were in the squad the day the Nationalliga A season started on 31 August 1947 but subsequently left the club after that date.

 
 
 

 
 

 
 
 

 

Players who left the squad

Results

Legend

Friendly matches

Pre and mid-season

Winter break and mid-season

Nationalliga

League matches

League standings

Swiss Cup

See also
 History of FC Basel
 List of FC Basel players
 List of FC Basel seasons

References

Sources 
 Rotblau: Jahrbuch Saison 2014/2015. Publisher: FC Basel Marketing AG. 
 Die ersten 125 Jahre. Publisher: Josef Zindel im Friedrich Reinhardt Verlag, Basel. 
 The FCB team 1947–48 at fcb-archiv.ch
 Switzerland 1947–48 by Erik Garin at Rec.Sport.Soccer Statistics Foundation

External links
 FC Basel official site

FC Basel seasons
Basel